Golf Punks is a 1998 American sports comedy film starring Tom Arnold as an out-of-work golf pro, who gets pulled into teaching the game to a group of young golfers at a public course.

Cast
 Tom Arnold - Al Oliver
 James Kirk - Peter
 Rene Tardif - Allister McGrath
 Katelyn Wallace - Christina
 Rhys Huber - Billy
 Neil Denis - Thork
 Tarik Batal - Raghad
 Katrina Pratt - Mai
 Greg Thirloway - Bo
 Cory Fry - Cameron
 Alf Humphreys - Jack (as Alfred E. Humphreys)
 Elizabeth Carol Savenkoff - Nancy
 Jano Frandsen - Trip Davis
 French Tickner - Burt
 Lee Taylor - Harry
 Jerry Wasserman - Joe
 Dave 'Squatch' Ward - Tiny
 Lachlan Murdoch - Bernie
 William MacDonald - Phelps
 Hot Waluigi - Hot Waluigi
 Marcus Hondro - Dave McMillan
 Jonathan Palis - Jake
 Tara Lea - Ms. Williamson
 Brendan Beiser - News Reporter

References

External links
 
 
 

1998 films
Golf films
Golf Punks
1990s sports comedy films
1998 comedy films
1990s English-language films